Café is a monthly Swedish men's magazine focused on fashion, style, and culture, including articles on food, movies, fitness, sex, music, travel, sports, technology, and books. The magazine is comparable to U.S. publications such as Esquire and GQ. It is published in Stockholm, Sweden.

History and profile
Café debuted in May 1990, aimed toward the new generation of metrosexual men. Initially, the magazine was published by now-defunct Rosenudde Publishing. In December 1991, the magazine was bought out by Hachette Sweden Ltd., a subsidiary of Hachetter Filipacchi Media. The magazine is part of Aller Media AB, which acquired it from Hachetter Filipacchi Media in 2007. It is published by a subsidiary of the company in Stockholm.  One of the sister magazines of Café is Svensk Damtidning. 

From 2003 to 2013 Markus Kylén was the editor-in-chief of Café. Jens Stenberg replaced him in the post. Due to its success in Sweden the magazine has branched out to Finland with its large Swedish-speaking audience.

The circulation of Café was 20,800 copies in 2014.

Covers
The first issue of Cafe featured professional footballer Glenn Hysén. Subsequent covers featured mostly male actors and sports figures such as Sean Connery and Mike Tyson. By the mid-nineties, the covers predominantly featured women, mostly famous Swedish models.

Victoria Silvstedt has appeared on the magazine's cover a total of 10 times and counting. Other notable celebrities who have frequently been featured on the cover are Izabella Scorupco, Anine Bing, Pernilla Wahlgren, Carolina Gynning, Marie Serneholt, and Emma Johnsson.

See also
List of men's magazines

References

External links
Cafe.se

1990 establishments in Sweden
Magazines established in 1990
Magazines published in Stockholm
Men's fashion magazines
Men's magazines published in Sweden
Monthly magazines published in Sweden
Swedish-language magazines